The Drammen Line is a  railway line between Oslo and Drammen, Norway, which was opened on 7 October 1872. It serves all trains west of Oslo Central Station and is owned by Bane NOR.

The line opened as a  narrow gauge railway, and rebuilt to standard gauge between 1913 and 1922. The line was electrified in 1922, as the first line on the national network to be electrified. The Lieråsen Tunnel shortened the line in 1973, and in 1980 the Oslo Tunnel was built, allowing the line to connect to the new Oslo Central Station. The Asker Line runs parallel to the Drammen Line, mostly in tunnels.

At Drammen, the Vestfold Line branches off to the south while the Bergen Line and the Sørlandet Line continue together to Hokksund along the Randsfjorden Line. The entire line has double track due to the heavy traffic on the line. The longest Norwegian railway bridge is just before Drammen where the line crosses the Drammen river. That bridge is 454 metres long.

History
Both Drammen and Oslo were important ports serving Eastern Norway, and both had by the 1870s their own railway lines. Oslo was connected to Romerike by the Hoved Line and to Sweden by the Kongsvinger Line, while Drammen was connected to Ringerike by the Randsfjorden Line. The most important use of the lines were shipment of lumber to the respective ports for export, but the lines also saw an increasing passenger traffic. Due to the cheap and quick construction method propagated by NSB at the time, the Randsfjord Line was built in narrow gauge; the lines connecting to Oslo were on the other hand built in standard gauge, to ensure compatibility with the Swedish railway network. There was a considerable feeling of rivalry between the two cities at the time, and particularly in Drammen there was skepticism of building a line that could dilute the cities regional influence on behalf of the capital.

Radical forces eventually succeeded in changing the tide of opinion, and Drammen politicians allowed the construction of the line. The rail gauge issue still created a problem, as did the location of the railway station in Oslo; Oslo East Station was located at the then east end of the city, and a line from Drammen—located to the west of Oslo—would either have to take the long trip around the north of the city, or terminate at a separate station on the west end. The latter solution was chosen, and Oslo West Station was opened along with the new line.

Electrification and double track
Built as a narrow gauge railway, the Drammen Line was converted to a dual gauge railway between 1917 and 1920.  On 13 November 1922 the dual gauge was removed. The line from Oslo V to Brakerøya was electrified on 26 November 1922 while the line from Brakerøya to Drammen was electrified on 6 May 1930. The Drammen Line was the second railway line in Norway to be rebuilt to double track. The line from Oslo V to Sandvika was opened with double track on 26 November 1922 while the line from Sandvika to Asker was extended in three steps: Billingstad–Hvalstad on 24 July 1953, Hvalstad–Asker on 29 November 1955 and Sandvika–Billingstad on 9 November 1958. Double track further to Brakerøya in Drammen opened with the Lieråsen Tunnel, while the last part over the bridge into Drammen Station was finished in 1996.

Lieråsen Tunnel

Part of the old line, from Asker to Spikkestad, has been kept as the single-tracked Spikkestad Line, used by commuter trains.

Oslo Tunnel

After decades of planning, the  Oslo Tunnel opened in 1980, extending the Drammen Line from Skøyen to the new Oslo Central Station, that replaced Oslo East Station. The former terminus of Oslo West Station was closed, and has since been converted into the office of the Nobel Peace Prize. The railway from Skøyen to Oslo V has been reclassified to the Skøyen–Filipstad Line, and is used for freight trains serving the Oslo Port. The former Port Line that connected the east and west stations was removed.

Asker Line

The Asker Line is an partially completed line that supplements the Drammen Line between Oslo and Asker. Construction started in 2001, with the first section from Asker to Sandvika opening in 2005. The section from Sandvika to Lysaker opened in 2011. The construction of the last section in the original plans, from Lysaker to Skøyen, was first postponed until after 2020, but in 2020, new planning started for a longer project extending all the way to Oslo Central Station, bypassing Skøyen to the north on the preferred route. The line only serves Asker, Sandvika and Lysaker (the planned extension will add Nationaltheatret and Oslo Central), and allowed the capacity west of Lysaker to increase from 12 to 26 trains per hour. It is also used by freight trains at night.

See also 
 Narrow gauge railways in Norway

References 

 
Railway lines in Oslo
Railway lines in Viken
Railway lines opened in 1872
Flytoget
Electric railways in Norway
1872 establishments in Norway
3 ft 6 in gauge railways in Norway
Standard gauge railways in Norway